Kristen Marie Merlin (born December 13, 1984) is an American country singer. She is best known for finishing in the top 5 on Season 6 of NBC's signing competition The Voice in 2014 as a part of Shakira's team.

Career

2014: The Voice
At the blind auditions on February 24, 2014, Merlin performed Sugarland’s "Something More," persuading Adam Levine and Shakira to turn their chairs. Merlin chose Shakira and remained on her team the entire season.

During the season's first live episode, Merlin's microphone went dead while she was singing Sugarland's "Stay." Merlin continued to sing until she was brought another microphone about 20 seconds later, allowing the audience to hear the final note of the song. She received overwhelming enthusiasm from the audience and the coaches.

Adam Levine praised Merlin for her performance, saying, "You handled it so gracefully. It was as if nothing happened. Well done. I would have been in a puddle of my own nerves. I would have been crying. I would have had a thumb in my mouth. That was real inspiring to see you be cool – ice water in your veins."

During the semi-finals, Merlin performed Miranda Lambert's "Gunpowder & Lead," and Jewel's "Foolish Games." The latter made the top 10 on the iTunes top 100 singles chart. Merlin and Kat Perkins were eliminated, while Josh Kaufman, Jake Worthington and Christina Grimmie progressed to the finals.

Merlin toured 31 U.S. cities on "The Voice Tour" in 2014. Other performers included Season 6's Kaufman, Worthington, Grimmie and Jake Barker, Season 5's Tessanne Chin, Jacquie Lee and Will Champlin, Season 4's Holly Tucker and Season 1's Dia Frampton.

2015–present: Boomerang and Humans Being
On January 20, 2015, Merlin independently released her first EP, Boomerang, which reached #2 on Billboard's Heatseekers Northeast chart. Boomerang was produced by Corey Britz, engineered by Paul Fig, and recorded at Southland Records in Los Angeles. The five-track EP features four songs written by Merlin, "A Little While," "Confusion," "For Now," and "Pocket Love Song." The title track, "Boomerang," was co-written by Corey and Kara Britz.

On February 8, 2019, Merlin released her second independently-released EP, Humans Being, which reached No. 4 on Billboard's Heatseekers Northeast chart. The first single from the EP, "Don’t Call It a Comeback" (written by Alex Kline, Kellys Collins and Hannah Blaylock) was released on October 26, 2018. The five-track EP includes three songs co-written by Merlin, "Disengage" (written with Rob Pagnano and Lauren Weintraub), "Anyway" (written with Chris Parker), and "Humans Being" (written with Brian Dean Maher and Skip Black), as well as "Living Proof" (written by Matthew McVaney, Emily Weisband and Jennifer Schott).

Discography

Extended plays

Releases from The Voice

Music videos

References

1984 births
American women country singers
American country singer-songwriters
American women singer-songwriters
Country musicians from Massachusetts
American lesbian musicians
LGBT people from Massachusetts
Living people
People from Hanson, Massachusetts
The Voice (franchise) contestants
21st-century American singers
21st-century American women singers
20th-century LGBT people
21st-century LGBT people
Singer-songwriters from Massachusetts